VVT-i, or Variable Valve Timing with intelligence, is an automobile variable valve timing technology developed by Toyota. It was first introduced in 1995 with the 2JZ-GE engine found in the JZS155 Toyota Crown and Crown Majesta.

The VVT-i system replaces the previous Toyota VVT system first introduced in 1991 with the five-valve per cylinder 4A-GE "Silver Top" engine found in the AE101 Corolla Levin and Sprinter Trueno. The VVT system is a 2-stage hydraulically controlled cam phasing system.

VVT-i varies the timing of the intake valves by adjusting the relationship between the camshaft drive (belt or chain) and intake camshaft. Engine oil pressure is applied to an actuator to adjust the camshaft position. Adjustments in the overlap time between the exhaust valve closing and intake valve opening result in improved engine efficiency. Variants of the system, including VVTL-i, Dual VVT-i, VVT-iE, VVT-iW and Valvematic, have followed.

VVTL-i 

VVTL-i (Variable Valve Timing and Lift intelligent system) (also sometimes denoted as VVT-iL or Variable Valve Timing and Intelligence with Lift) is an enhanced version of VVT-i that can alter valve lift (and duration) as well as valve timing. In the case of the 16-valve 2ZZ-GE, the engine head resembles a typical DOHC design, featuring separate cams for intake and exhaust and featuring two intake and two exhaust valves (four total) per cylinder. Unlike a conventional design, each camshaft has two lobes per cylinder, one optimized for lower rpm operation and one optimized for high rpm operation, with higher lift and longer duration. Each valve pair is controlled by one rocker arm, which is operated by the camshaft. Each rocker arm has a slipper follower mounted to the rocker arm with a spring, allowing the slipper-follower to freely move up and down with the high lobe without affecting the rocker arm.  When the engine is operating below 6000-7000 rpm (dependent on year, car, and ECU installed), the lower lobe is operating the rocker arm and thus the valves, and the slipper-follower is freewheeling next to the rocker arm. When the engine is operating above the lift engagement point, the ECU activates an oil pressure switch which pushes a sliding pin under the slipper-follower on each rocker arm. The rocker arm is now locked into the slipper-follower's movements and thus follows the movement of the high rpm cam lobe and will operate with the high rpm cam profile until the pin is disengaged by the ECU. The lift system is similar in principle to Honda's VTEC operation.

The system was first introduced in the 2ZZ-GE found in the 1999 Toyota Celica. Toyota has ceased production of its VVTL-i engines in most markets, because the engine does not meet Euro IV specifications for emissions regulations. As a result, this system has been discontinued on some Toyota models, including the Corolla T-Sport (Europe), Corolla Sportivo (Australia), Celica, Corolla XRS, Matrix XRS, and the Pontiac Vibe GT, all of which had the 2ZZ-GE engine fitted. The Lotus Elise continues to offer the 2ZZ-GE and the 1ZZ-FE engine, while the Exige offers the engine with a supercharger.

Dual VVT-i

The Dual VVT-i system adjusts timing on both intake and exhaust camshafts. It was first introduced in 1998 on the RS200 Altezza's 3S-GE engine. Dual VVT-i is also found in Toyota's 3.5-litre 2GR-FE V6 engine, first appearing on the 2005 Avalon. This engine can be found on numerous Toyota and Lexus models.

By adjusting the valve timing, engine start and stop occurs almost unnoticeably at minimum compression. Fast heating of the catalytic converter to its light-off temperature is possible, thereby reducing hydrocarbon emissions considerably.

Most Toyota engines including the 1LR-GUE (V10, used in the Lexus LFA), UR engines (V8), GR engines (V6), AR engines (large I4), ZR engines (medium I4), and NR engines (small I4) use this technology.

VVT-iE

VVT-iE (Variable Valve Timing - intelligent by Electric motor) is a version of Dual VVT-i that uses an electrically operated actuator to adjust and maintain intake camshaft timing. The exhaust camshaft timing is still controlled using a hydraulic actuator. This form of variable valve timing technology was developed initially for Lexus vehicles. This system was first introduced on the 1UR-FSE engine in the 2007 Lexus LS 460.

The electric motor in the actuator spins together with the intake camshaft as the engine runs. To maintain camshaft timing, the actuator motor will operate at the same speed as the camshaft. To advance the camshaft timing, the actuator motor will rotate slightly faster than the camshaft speed. To retard camshaft timing, the actuator motor will rotate slightly slower than camshaft speed. The speed difference between the actuator motor and camshaft timing is used to operate a mechanism that varies the camshaft timing. The benefit of the electric actuation is enhanced response and accuracy at low engine speeds and at lower temperatures as well as a greater total range of adjustment. The combination of these factors allows more precise control, resulting in an improvement of both fuel economy, engine output and emissions performance.

VVT-iW

VVT-iW (Variable Valve Timing - intelligent Wide) was introduced with the 2.0L turbocharged direct-injected 8AR-FTS fitted to the Lexus NX 200t. VVT-iW uses VVT-iW on the intake valves and VVT-i on the exhaust valves. The intake cam has mid-position cam lock mechanism that retards the continuously variable timing. It offers expanded valve opening angles (Wide) which enables the engine to operate in a modified-Atkinson cycle at low rpm for improved economy and lower emissions, and in the Otto cycle at high rpm for better performance, while delivering high torque throughout the rpm band.

Valvematic

The Valvematic system offers continuous adjustment to valve lift and timing and improves fuel efficiency by controlling the fuel/air intake using valve control rather than conventional throttle plate control. The technology made its first appearance in 2007 with the 3ZR-FAE engine in the Noah and later in early-2009 in the Avensis.  This system is simpler in design compared to Valvetronic and VVEL, allowing the cylinder head to remain at the same height.

VVT-i Oil Supply Hose Issues

In 2010, Toyota USA announced a Limited Service Campaign (LSC 90K) to replace the rubber portion of the oil supply hose for the VVT-i actuator on the 2GR-FE (V6) engine, which were found to be defective. In all, approximately 1.6 million vehicles manufactured prior to 2008 were affected.  The defective oil supply hoses were prone to degradation and eventual rupture, causing oil to rapidly leak and resulting in permanent engine damage.

In 2014, the LSC 90K Campaign was extended to 31 December 2021 on 117,500 Toyota brand vehicles that were "missed" during the initial campaign.

See also 
 Variable valve timing
 Variable valve lift
 Gasoline Direct Injection (Toyota D4 and D4-S)
 Variable Length Intake Manifold
 List of Toyota engines

References

External links 
 Youtube video: How VVT-i system works Toyota engine
 VVT-i video animation
  Video animation of VVT-i can be found here (courtesy of PT. Toyota-Astra Motor, Indonesia)
 VVTL-i walkthrough
 VVTL-i flash animation
 Information about Toyota's Limited Service Campaign 90k

Variable valve timing
Toyota
Lexus